The men's 200 metres event at the 1975 Pan American Games was held in Mexico City on 15 and 16 October.

Medalists

Results

Heats
Wind:Heat 1: 0.0 m/s, Heat 2: 0.0 m/s, Heat 3: -1.2 m/s, Heat 4: -1.1 m/s

Semifinals
Wind:Heat 1: -2.2 m/s, Heat 2: -2.0 m/s

Final
Wind: -2.4 m/s

References

Athletics at the 1975 Pan American Games
1975